Roberto Freire (São Paulo, b. January 18, 1927; São Paulo, d. May 23, 2008) was a medical psychiatrist and Brazilian writer, who created somatherapy (Portuguese: somaterapia), also referred to as SOMA, an anarchist therapy based on the then radical new ideas of Wilhelm Reich, as well as the Brazilian martial art Capoeira Angola.

Somatherapy 

Somatherapy (or Soma) was created by the Freire in the 1970s as a group therapy, based on the research of the psychoanalyst Wilhelm Reich.  With the objective of freeing the individual to be more creative, the exercises in Soma work with the relationship between the body and emotions.  Other essential ingredients in Soma are the studies of antipsychiatry related to human communication and the Brazilian martial art / dance Capoeira Angola.  Soma groups last a year and a half, with frequent sessions, including usually one full weekend per month for the entire group, as well as frequent capoeira classes, study sessions, social activities, and two self-organized group trips. These times together allow the participants to build and develop the group dynamic, in line with the principles of anarchism.

References 

 http://enciclopedia.itaucultural.org.br/pessoa400283/roberto-freire
 http://www1.folha.uol.com.br/ilustrada/2008/05/405070-escritor-e-psiquiatra-roberto-freire-morre-aos-81-anos-em-sp.shtml

1927 births
2008 deaths
Brazilian psychiatrists
Brazilian male writers
Brazilian anarchists
20th-century Brazilian physicians